The Main road 45 is a north-south direction Secondary class main road in the Tiszántúl (Alföld) region of Hungary, that connects the Main road 44 change to the Main road 47, facilitating access from Kunszentmárton to Hódmezővásárhely. The road is 53 km long.

The road, as well as all other main roads in Hungary, is managed and maintained by Magyar Közút, state owned company.

Sources

See also

 Roads in Hungary
 Transport in Hungary

External links

 Hungarian Public Road Non-Profit Ltd. (Magyar Közút Nonprofit Zrt.)
 National Infrastructure Developer Ltd.

Main roads in Hungary
Transport in Jász-Nagykun-Szolnok County
Csongrád-Csanád County